The Green Fields of Foreverland is the first studio album by Isobel Campbell's solo project, The Gentle Waves. It was originally released through Jeepster Records on 5 April 1999. It peaked at number 30 on the UK Independent Albums Chart, as well as number 89 on the Scottish Albums Chart.

Track listing

Personnel
Credits adapted from liner notes.
 Isobel Campbell – lead vocals, guitar, cello, piano, vibraphone, glockenspiel, melodica
 Margaret Smith – flute
 Richard Colburn – drums, shaker, triangle, bongo, cymbal
 Stuart Murdoch – bass guitar, synthesizer, backing vocals
 Stevie Jackson – guitar
 Mick Cooke – trumpet
 Chris Geddes – piano, Rhodes piano, autoharp
 David McKay – violin
 Moyra Clausson – clarinet

Charts

References

External links
 

1999 debut albums
Isobel Campbell albums
Jeepster Records albums